Pentacalia is a genus of flowering plants in the family Asteraceae.  About 34 members of this genus appear to be located in the South American county Ecuador, where they are threatened by habitat loss.  The genus contains approximately two hundred species, which are distributed from Mexico to northern South America.

Species of Pentacalia
Species accepted by the Plants of the World Online as of December 2022: 

Pentacalia aedoi 
Pentacalia albotecta 
Pentacalia andrei 
Pentacalia arborea 
Pentacalia asplundii 
Pentacalia axillariflora 
Pentacalia bacopoides 
Pentacalia badilloi 
Pentacalia balsasana 
Pentacalia basitruncata 
Pentacalia beckii 
Pentacalia brenesii 
Pentacalia breviligulata 
Pentacalia buchtienii 
Pentacalia cadiriensis 
Pentacalia caliana 
Pentacalia calyculata 
Pentacalia campii 
Pentacalia candelariae 
Pentacalia caracasana 
Pentacalia carchiensis 
Pentacalia cardenasii 
Pentacalia carmelana 
Pentacalia carmelitana 
Pentacalia carpishensis 
Pentacalia cazaletii 
Pentacalia chachapoyensis 
Pentacalia chaquiroensis 
Pentacalia chiribogae 
Pentacalia cobrensis 
Pentacalia comarapensis 
Pentacalia corazonensis 
Pentacalia cuatrecasasiana 
Pentacalia cutervonis 
Pentacalia danielis 
Pentacalia davidsmithii 
Pentacalia decomposita 
Pentacalia desiderabilis 
Pentacalia diamantensis 
Pentacalia dictyophlebia 
Pentacalia diplostephioides 
Pentacalia disciformis 
Pentacalia divisoria 
Pentacalia dorrii 
Pentacalia ellipticifolia 
Pentacalia encanoana 
Pentacalia epidendra 
Pentacalia epiphytica 
Pentacalia floccosa 
Pentacalia freemanii 
Pentacalia genuflexa 
Pentacalia gibbiflora 
Pentacalia gonocaulos 
Pentacalia guambiana 
Pentacalia guanentana 
Pentacalia guerrerensis 
Pentacalia hachana 
Pentacalia haticoensis 
Pentacalia haughtii 
Pentacalia herzogii 
Pentacalia hillii 
Pentacalia huallagana 
Pentacalia huilensis 
Pentacalia hurtadoi 
Pentacalia inornata 
Pentacalia involuta 
Pentacalia jahnii 
Pentacalia jalcana 
Pentacalia jelskii 
Pentacalia lewisii 
Pentacalia lophophilus 
Pentacalia loretensis 
Pentacalia lucidissimus 
Pentacalia luteynorum 
Pentacalia magnusii 
Pentacalia matagalpensis 
Pentacalia maynasensis 
Pentacalia mikanioides 
Pentacalia millei 
Pentacalia morazensis 
Pentacalia moronensis 
Pentacalia mucronatifolia 
Pentacalia napoensis 
Pentacalia neblinensis 
Pentacalia nunezii 
Pentacalia ochracea 
Pentacalia odorata 
Pentacalia oronocensis 
Pentacalia pailasensis 
Pentacalia paipana 
Pentacalia palaciosii 
Pentacalia parasitica 
Pentacalia pavonii 
Pentacalia petiolincrassata 
Pentacalia phanerandra 
Pentacalia phelpsiae 
Pentacalia phorodendroides 
Pentacalia pomacochana 
Pentacalia popayanensis 
Pentacalia poyasensis 
Pentacalia psidiifolia 
Pentacalia ptariana 
Pentacalia purpurivenosa 
Pentacalia retroflexa 
Pentacalia ricoensis 
Pentacalia riotintis 
Pentacalia robertii 
Pentacalia ruficaulis 
Pentacalia rufohirsuta 
Pentacalia rugosa 
Pentacalia sagasteguii 
Pentacalia scortifolia 
Pentacalia sevillana 
Pentacalia silvascandens 
Pentacalia sinforosi 
Pentacalia sisavitensis 
Pentacalia sonsonensis 
Pentacalia stergiosii 
Pentacalia streptothamna 
Pentacalia subdiscolor 
Pentacalia subglomerosa 
Pentacalia suboppositifolia 
Pentacalia supernitens 
Pentacalia sylvicola 
Pentacalia tablensis 
Pentacalia tarapotensis 
Pentacalia theifolia 
Pentacalia tingoensis 
Pentacalia todziae 
Pentacalia tomasiana 
Pentacalia tonduzii 
Pentacalia trianae 
Pentacalia tropicalis 
Pentacalia ucumariana 
Pentacalia ullucosana 
Pentacalia urbani 
Pentacalia uribei 
Pentacalia urubambensis 
Pentacalia vallejiana 
Pentacalia vargasiana 
Pentacalia veleziae 
Pentacalia venturae 
Pentacalia vicelliptica 
Pentacalia vulpinaris 
Pentacalia weinmannifolia 
Pentacalia wilburii 
Pentacalia wurdackii 
Pentacalia yanetharum 
Pentacalia yapacana 
Pentacalia zakii 
Pentacalia zamorana

References

  General information on genus

 
Asteraceae genera
Taxonomy articles created by Polbot